The Army Medal for War 1939-1945 was created in 1945 by the Polish government in Exile (in London) to reward members of the Polish ground forces for service during World War II. The eligibility criteria were: six months of operational service during World War II, or 12 months in a non-operational role. The medal could be conferred up to four times, although for a subsequent award the period of service was doubled.

References

Polish campaign medals